West Virginia Route 210 is a north–south state highway located entirely within the city of Beckley, West Virginia. The southern terminus of the route is at U.S. Route 19 (former U.S. Route 21) in southeastern Beckley. The northern terminus is at West Virginia Route 16 north of downtown.

Major intersections

References

210
Transportation in Raleigh County, West Virginia